The Triumphal Arch of Orange is a triumphal arch located in the town of Orange, southeast France. There is debate about when the arch was built, but current research that accepts the inscription as evidence favours a date during the reign of emperor Augustus (27 BC–AD 14). It was built on the former via Agrippa to honor the veterans of the Gallic Wars and Legio II Augusta. It was later reconstructed by emperor Tiberius to celebrate the victories of Germanicus over the German tribes in Rhineland. The arch contains an inscription dedicated to emperor Tiberius in AD 27. Along with the Roman Theatre of Orange, the Triumphal Arch was inscribed on the UNESCO World Heritage List in 1981 because of its exceptional preservation.

Description

The arch was built into the town's walling during the Middle Ages to guard the northern entry points of the town. Architect Auguste Caristie studied the arch and carried out restoration work in the late 1820s. The arch was originally constructed using large unmortared limestone blocks. It has three arches, the center one being larger than the flanking ones. The entire structure measures 19.57 meters long by 8.40 meters wide, standing to a height of 19.21 meters. Each façade has four semi-engaged Corinthian columns. The arch is the oldest surviving example of a design that was used later in Rome itself, for the Arch of Septimius Severus and the Arch of Constantine. The visible pocks or holes are supposedly left by practicing medieval crossbowmen with little appreciation for art or history.

On the northern (outward-facing) facade, the architrave and cornice have been cut back and a bronze inscription inserted, now lost; attempts at reconstructing its text from the placement of cramp holes for the projecting tines of its letters have not been successful. The arch is decorated with various reliefs of military themes, including naval battles, spoils of war and Romans battling Germanics and Gauls. A Roman foot soldier carrying the shield of Legio II Augusta is seen on the north front battle relief.

See also
 List of Roman triumphal arches

References

1st-century establishments in the Roman Empire
Buildings and structures completed in the 1st century
Augustan building projects
World Heritage Sites in France
Archaeological sites in France
Ancient Roman buildings and structures in France
Triumphal arches in France
Buildings and structures in Vaucluse
Terminating vistas in France
Tourist attractions in Vaucluse
Roman sites in Provence
Orange, Vaucluse